"Sister Golden Hair" is a song by the band America from their fifth album Hearts (1975), written by Gerry Beckley. It was their second single to reach number one on the U.S. Billboard Hot 100, remaining in the top position for one week.

Background
Beckley says "There was no actual Sister Gold Hair." The lyrics were largely inspired by the works of Jackson Browne. Beckley commented, "[Jackson Browne] has a knack, an ability to put words to music, that is much more like the L.A. approach to just genuine observation as opposed to simplifying it down to its bare essentials... I find Jackson can depress me a little bit, but only through his honesty; and it was that style of his which led to a song of mine, 'Sister Golden Hair', which is probably the more L.A. of my lyrics." Beckley adds that "Sister Golden Hair" "was one of the first times I used 'ain't' in a song, but I wasn't making an effort to. I was just putting myself in that frame of mind and I got those kind of lyrics out of it."

Record World said it is "the story of a guy who's found love at last but doesn't necessarily want to marry her."

Instrumentation
Gerry Beckley said he played the 12-string guitar, and overdubbed the prominent slide guitar. "I had a lovely lap steel that David Lindley had picked out."

Music video
The music video for the song features the band performing the song on The Midnight Special, a popular musical television show. However this is not an official video, just the studio track overdubbed over the live performance.

Chart performance

Weekly charts

Year-end charts

References

External links
 

1975 songs
1975 singles
Songs written by Gerry Beckley
America (band) songs
The Dandy Warhols songs
Song recordings produced by George Martin
Billboard Hot 100 number-one singles
Warner Records singles